Brush Lake is a lake in Berrien County, in the U.S. state of Michigan.

Brush Lake was named for the brush in the area.

References

Lakes of Berrien County, Michigan